Transat may refer to:
 Transat A.T., Canadian tour and travel agency
 Air Transat, Canadian airline owned by Transat A.T.
 Concept Composites MD03 Transat, French ultralight aircraft
 "The Transat", also called the Single-Handed Trans-Atlantic Race

See also
 Transit (disambiguation)